Angelica Nwandu (born 1989) is the founder of the Shade Room (TSR), an Instagram-based media company focused on celebrity gossip. The site has since branched out into covering politics and focusing on Black culture news. The Shade Room has over 20 million subscribers across all platforms. Nwandu was dubbed "The Oprah of our generation" by Refinery29 and a "celebrity culture savant" by Complex. Time magazine named TSR in the 30 most influential on the internet in 2016.  The New York Times called the Shade Room "Instagram's TMZ".

Early life and education
Angelica Nwandu was born in 1989 in Los Angeles, California, to Nigerian parents. She graduated from Loyola Marymount University.

Career

The Shade Room

In 2016, Forbes named Nwandu to its 30 Under 30 list, saying she "revolutionized celebrity gossip" with the founding of the Shade Room. Cosmopolitan reports that the Shade Room's followers across platforms now total more than eight million people. TechCrunch named her to its list of "18 Female Founders Who Killed It in 2015" and BuzzFeed says Nwandu is "figuring things out faster than everyone else."

Film
Nwandu has also been a Sundance fellow and Time Warner HBO fellow 2014 selected for the January 2014 Screenwriters Lab. The project, developed with co-writer Jordana Spiro, is called Night Comes On. It premiered at the 2018 Sundance Film Festival where it won the NEXT Innovator award. Samuel Goldwyn Films acquired the film for distribution, with a simultaneous theatrical and VOD release set for August 3, 2018.

References

External links
The Shade Room

Living people
21st-century American non-fiction writers
American online journalists
American people of Nigerian descent
1989 births
American women journalists
Place of birth missing (living people)
Loyola Marymount University alumni
Sundance Film Festival award winners
21st-century American women writers
21st-century American screenwriters